The Mount Stephen Club was a gentlemen's club in Montreal, located inside the George Stephen House, built in 1880-1883. Considered a lair of the wealthy community of Anglophone Montrealers, It was founded in 1926 as a private business club for men by mining magnate Noah Timmins, J.H. Maher and J.S. Dohan, and named after the house's first owner, Lord George Stephen. Starting in 1964, women were allowed to come in by the same entrance as men, on Thursdays only, and in the-mid 1970s, women became equal members to men in the club until it closed in 2011.Various well-known people have visited Mount Stephen Club over the years, including Princess Margaret, Countess of Snowdon, Prince Andrew of Southend, Princess Benedikte of Denmark, John Diefenbaker, Pierre Trudeau, Brian Mulroney, Percival Molson, Lucien Bouchard, Louise Harel, Edgar Bronfman.

See also 

 List of gentlemen's clubs in Canada

References

External links

Gentlemen's clubs in Canada
1926 establishments in Quebec
2011 disestablishments in Quebec
Organizations based in Montreal